Tseng Yung-chuan (born 10 September 1947) is a Taiwanese politician. He was the Secretary-General of the Kuomintang from 2012 to 2014.

Education
Tseng graduated from Feng Chia University.

Kuomintang Secretary-General

Secretary-General appointment
Tseng was appointed to be the Secretary-General of Kuomintang on 27 September 2012. He replaced Lin Join-sane from the position because of Lin's appointment to be the Chairman of Straits Exchange Foundation. Tseng vowed to work hard for the party's success in the 2014 seven-in-one local elections. He will also travel to every corner of Taiwan to listen to the voice of Taiwanese people. He vowed to insist on reform and integrity in government, strengthen the platform of the party and government and re-energize the party by encouraging more talented people to stand as KMT candidates in elections.

References

External links

1947 births
Members of the 4th Legislative Yuan
Living people
Kuomintang Members of the Legislative Yuan in Taiwan
Members of the 5th Legislative Yuan
Members of the 7th Legislative Yuan
Pingtung County Members of the Legislative Yuan
Party List Members of the Legislative Yuan
Members of the 2nd Legislative Yuan
Members of the 3rd Legislative Yuan